Taşkuyu is a village in Tarsus district of Mersin Province, Turkey. It is close to Eshabıkehf, the cave of Seven Sleepers, which is considered as a pilgrimage center by some. The population of village is 433 as of 2012.

References

Villages in Tarsus District